Karnowski (feminine: Karnowka; plural: Karnowscy) is a Polish-language surname. It may refer to:

Jan Karnowski (1886–1939), Polish judge and poet
Przemek Karnowski (born 1993), Polish basketball player

See also
Karwowski

Polish-language surnames